Jack Roles (born 26 February 1999) is a professional footballer  who plays as a midfielder for Crawley Town. Born in England, he represents Cyprus at international level.

Club career

Tottenham Hotspur
Roles was born in Enfield, London and attended Enfield Grammar School where he played for the school football team winning a number of trophies. Tottenham signed Roles to the academy in 2015. In June 2019 Roles had his contract with Tottenham extended until 2021.

Roles first appeared for Tottenham's senior team in the 2018–19 pre-season, appearing off of the bench in a friendly against Juventus.

In August 2019 Roles went out on loan to Cambridge United, who played in League Two. He was put straight into the squad for his Football League debut against Scunthorpe United, with Cambridge winning 3–2. His first senior goal came the following month against Mansfield Town, Cambridge's first in a 4–0 win.

Roles was named the league's player of the month for October 2019, and his 30-yard strike against Macclesfield Town was nominated for goal of the month too.

In September 2020 Roles went out on loan to Burton Albion of EFL League One.

On 1 February 2021, Roles joined League Two club Stevenage on loan.

On 27 May Tottenham announced that they had released Roles from his contract.

Crystal Palace
After a trial, Crystal Palace signed Roles on a free transfer. In January 2022, he left the club, having made six appearances for the under-23 team.

Woking
On 4 February 2022, Roles signed for National League side Woking. He subsequently made his Woking debut as a 90th minute substitute in the 2–2 draw at Altrincham. Roles signed a new one-year deal at the end of the 2021–22 season.

Crawley Town
On 31 January 2023, Roles signed for League Two club Crawley Town for an undisclosed fee on an eighteen-month contract.

International career
Born in England, Roles is of Cypriot descent through his mother. He is a youth international for Cyprus, having represented the Cyprus U19 and U21s.

Career statistics

References

External links
 
 Jack Roles profile @ cpfc.co.uk

1999 births
Living people
Footballers from the London Borough of Enfield
Cypriot footballers
Cyprus youth international footballers
Cyprus under-21 international footballers
English footballers
English people of Greek Cypriot descent
Tottenham Hotspur F.C. players
Cambridge United F.C. players
Burton Albion F.C. players
Stevenage F.C. players
Crystal Palace F.C. players
Woking F.C. players
Crawley Town F.C. players
Association football midfielders
English Football League players